Jack Jones (born 14 February 1992) is a Welsh musician, songwriter and poet. He is the lead singer and guitarist in the alternative rock band Trampolene, and lead guitarist in Peter Doherty and the Puta Madres. He also performs music and spoken word poetry as a solo artist, being the subject of a BBC Radio 4 documentary titled "Another Swansea Poet" broadcast in 2019. He was born in Swansea and currently lives between London, Berlin and Swansea.

Career

Music

Jones is songwriter, guitarist and lead singer in the band Trampolene.

During May 2016, Jones supported Peter Doherty on his UK "Eudaimonia" tour and played guitar for him. Venues included Glasgow Barrowland Ballroom and two nights at Hackney Empire in London. He also performed at The Libertines secret show at The Boogaloo, London in July 2016.

In 2016 he performed solo at Latitude Festival, whose website describes him as a "music icon".

In November 2016, the day after Trampolene headlined at The Water Rats in London, Jones flew to Argentina to become Doherty's lead guitarist in his band the Puta Madres, for a November/December 2016 tour of Argentina, France and UK. They played two shows for the reopening of Le Bataclan in Paris, followed by a week's tour across France and then Kentish Town Forum in London and Manchester Albert Hall. Jones opened the shows with a solo music and spoken word set, before rejoining the stage as Peter's lead guitarist. He was described in a five star review in The Independent as "Swansea's finest" and "sickeningly talented".

Jones played two solo shows at the end of 2016, Kazoopa Festival, Leeds in November  and This Feeling's New Year's Eve night at Nambucca, London.

He played two solo shows at Russell Brand's charity Trew Era Cafe, toured European and South American festivals across Europe in the summer as Doherty's guitarist and a performed a solo acoustic and spoken word set and a DJ set at Glastonbury festival.

In November 2017 Jones was interviewed by Janice Long and played acoustic songs live on her BBC Radio Wales show. He was also featured on the promotional video for Swansea's bid for City of Culture.

Jones was featured on "Red Stripe Presents: This Feeling TV" in May 2018.

To commemorate Trampolene's appearance at BBC Music's Biggest Weekend in Swansea in May 2018, Jones was featured in a "Wonder Wall" mural of Welsh musicians, by street artist Pure Evil.

His debut solo single, the AA side "Swim Up"/"It's Not My Thing" was released on 7 September 2018 and was played regularly on BBC Radio 1, Radio 6 and Radio X. The single was written with and features Mike Moore, who also plays guitar for Liam Gallagher. "It's Not My Thing" contains the riff from the track "DUST" by Lions of Dissent who are credited as the track's composers.

In October 2018 he played instore gigs and signing sessions on a short tour of Japan.

In 2019 Jones toured the UK with Peter Doherty and the Puta Madres, followed by a European tour and several festival appearances with them.

He played guitar and sang with Doherty on BBC Radio 4's "Loose Ends", broadcast on 13 April  and on John Kennedy's Xposure show on Radio X, broadcast 30 April 2019.

Jones supported Peter Doherty at PowerHaus (formally Dingwalls) in Camden, London on 24 and 25 July 2021. 

In November 2021 he completed his first solo tour, playing in Cardiff, London, Manchester and Glasgow with a set of music, spoken word poetry and anecdotes.

In 2022 Jones played solo shows in Swansea, Manchester, London and Basingstoke, plus the Love Trails festival in Gower, Wales. In December 2022 he returned to play The Bunkhouse in Swansea and ended the year with a New Year's Eve show at the Albion Rooms, Margate.

Spoken word
In addition to his poems being an integral part of Trampolene as a band, Jack Jones also performs spoken word poetry as a solo artist. Dr John Cooper Clarke has described his writing as "...exceptional poetry, funny and depressing at the same time and how often can you say that."

The video for Health & Wellbeing (at Wood Green Job Centre) was premiered on The Guardian website, Ketamine was premiered on Vice Noisey on 21 October 2015, Pound Land was premiered on Gigwise on 18 December 2015. Gigwise said of Jack Jones "indie has a new poster boy" in their article "Artists who are going to own 2016". Music business legend and 1965 Records owner James Endeacott described Trampolene as a "great band and their singer Jack is a wonder" when sharing the video for Artwork of Youth on his blog.

In 2015, Jones performed his poetry at The Great Escape Festival in Brighton, Stoke Newington Literary Festival and "Bring the Ruckus" at The Albany in London.

In January 2016 he was personally invited by Peter Doherty and Carl Barât of The Libertines to perform on their sell-out arena tour. He performed two poems and then welcomed the band to the stage in front of 20,000 fans. In his first feature in the NME he is introduced as "Jack Jones, singer in Welsh indie rockers Trampolene, plucked from life living in the back of his broken-down van to follow in the proud pre-Libs poetry footsteps of none other than Russell Brand." On 7 September 2016 he reprised this role to perform his "To Be A Libertine" poem and introduce The Libertines at Brixton Academy for their Unity Rocks charity show.

Jack Jones was the subject of a BBC Radio 4 documentary called "Another Swansea Poet", broadcast on 31 March 2019.

He performed a spoken word and solo music set at the Mother Wolf Club night in London on 24 June 2021.

His first solo tour in November 2021 included his spoken word poetry, songs and anecdotes.

Writing and other media 
Jones' first fashion shoot was for OutThere Style magazine, published February 2016 and was featured wearing jewellery for Pirate Treasures "Stage Style" collection also in February 2016.

Jones wrote an article for The Guardian which was published on 18 March 2016.

On 15 June 2016 the NME published a poem Jones wrote for them about the UK's EU Referendum, based on The Clash song "Should I Stay or Should I Go?".

In July 2022 he was a guest on the Gig Stories podcast recorded live at Kendal Calling festival, where he was performing with Trampolene.

Influences
Jones' writing influences include Julian Cope and Dylan Thomas and according to The Musical Manual his spoken word poem Ketamine "shares stark resemblance to workings of punk-poet legend, John Cooper Clarke.". Even the Stars music blog described "Ketamine" as "laced with wit and humour and the other ["Pound Land"] a droll comical observation of modern life based around a visit to Poundland". Jones has been described as a "singer, guitarist and full-on enigma", a "fine poet...With a John Cooper Clarke-esque delivery of his sideways glance into the uglier corners of modern society...wistful and witty poems" and as having "extraordinary stage presence".

References 

1992 births
Living people
Welsh rock singers
Welsh rock guitarists
Welsh songwriters
21st-century Welsh musicians
21st-century Welsh poets
21st-century British male writers